The Atacama Region is one of Chile's 16 first order administrative divisions. It comprises three provinces: Chañaral, Copiapó and Huasco. It is bordered to the north by Antofagasta, to the south by Coquimbo, to east with Provinces of Catamarca, La Rioja and San Juan of Argentina, and to the west by the Pacific Ocean. The region occupies the southern portion of the Atacama Desert, the rest of the desert is mainly distributed among the other regions of Norte Grande.

Demography
The Atacama Region is the third least populated region of the country, after Aysen and Magallanes. Of its total population, over 50% are located in the cities of Copiapó and Vallenar.

The largest cities are (2002 census data) Copiapó (125,983 inhabitants), Vallenar (43,750), Caldera (12,776), Chañaral (12,086), El Salvador (8,697) Tierra Amarilla (8,578), and Diego de Almagro (7,951).

History

The original inhabitants of this area, the Diaguitas and Changos valued its mineral wealth. Since the 19th century, iron, copper, silver, and gold have brought prosperity.

The region experienced a boom when the Chañarcillo silver mine was discovered in 1832. For many years, this was the world's third largest silver mine.

Natural features
Much of the region is desert, and encompasses considerable mineral resources. Numerous flora and fauna species are found in the Atacama Region. One subspecies of the lesser rhea, known by the scientific name Rhea pennata tarapacensis, is a notable large terrestrial bird in this region, which subspecies is considered endangered. The diminished numbers of this bird are due to prehistoric and modern hunting but more significantly due to agricultural land conversion in order to feed the expanding human population.

Economy

Mining accounts for 45% of the region's GDP and 90% of its exports. Moreover, various geological surveys have identified new deposits.
Iron ore mining is the most dynamic activity and there are numerous small-scale mines, which sell their output to ENAMI (the national mining company) for processing at its Paipote smelter. The region's main copper deposit is Candelaria, which produces around 200,000 tonnes per year and is controlled by Phelps Dodge, an international corporation. The next in size is El Salvador, owned by CODELCO, with an annual output of around 81,000 tonnes. Both mines export through the port of Chañaral.

Over recent decades, fresh fruit also emerged as regional export item, when the Copiapó and Huasco valleys joined Chile’s fruit-growing boom. They enjoy a comparative advantage because, thanks to the sunny climate, fruit ripens earlier than in the rest of the country and reaches northern hemisphere markets first.
Grapes are the main crop and, on a smaller scale, olives, tomatoes, peppers, onions, broad beans, citrus fruits, nectarines, apricots, oregano, and flowers.
The region's organic wealth, its clear waters and sheltered bays, together with its entrepreneurial experience, favor the development of aquaculture. Species produced include the northern scallop, Japanese and Chilean oysters, abalone, turbot, algae, and different varieties of mussels. Other products with more value added include boned fish fillets, smoked and salted fish, roe, and fishburgers.

The unique weather conditions in the Atacama desert, with extremely rare cloudy days, are ideal for solar power generation. Many PV and CSP plants are being built in this area.

See also
Flag of Atacama

References

 Teresa Moreno and Wes Gibbons. 2007. The geology of Chile, Geological Society of London, 414 pages

External links
Gobierno Regional de Atacama Official website 

 
Regions of Chile